Inter Club d'Escaldes is an Andorran football club based in Escaldes-Engordany. The club currently plays in Primera Divisió, where it is the current three-time defending champion.

History 
Inter Club d'Escaldes was founded in Escaldes-Engordany in 1991 and being founder member of Primera Divisió in 1995, the Premier League of Andorra. The club was playing since then in the top flight until April 2015 when the team was relegated after finishing 8th in the regular league. The club returned in Primera Divisió after two seasons, in May 2017.

L'Inter achieved twice the third position in Primera Divisió, during two consecutives seasons in 1999-00 and 2000–01, and became runners-up in Copa Constitució during the 2001–02 season, losing 2–0 against FC Lusitanos.

After becoming champion of the 2019–20 Primera Divisió, the club was able to have the right to participate in the 2020–21 UEFA Champions League, from the preliminary round. This historic partition represents the 1st time in the club's history that it has participated in an official international tournament.

Colors and badge
In its beginnings the club had a strong support of Construccions Modernes, a company linked to the construction, to the point that its initials CM remain until 2019 in its shield. Due to team colors, blue and black, the team and fans are referenced as blau-i-negres.

Honours
Primera Divisió
Champions (3): 2019–20, 2020–21, 2021–22
Copa Constitució
Winners (1): 2020
Runners-up (1): 2002
Supercopa Andorrana:
Winners (3): 2020, 2021, 2022
Segona Divisió
Winners (1): 2016–17

European record

Matches 

Notes
 PR: Preliminary round
 1Q: First qualifying round
 2Q: Second qualifying round

Current squad

References

External links 
Official website
Inter d'Escaldes at faf.ad
Inter d'Escaldes at UEFA.COM
Inter d'Escaldes at Weltfussball.de

Football clubs in Andorra
1991 establishments in Andorra
Association football clubs established in 1991